The following articles contain lists of non-sovereign nations:

Current
 List of active autonomist and secessionist movements, representing those nations which are currently part of a transnational state but would like to secede from the state.
 List of unrecognized states, representing those states which have declared independence, but whose independence has not been recognised by the majority of the international community.

Historical 
 List of historical autonomist and secessionist movements, that may or may not have succeeded in their goal.
 List of historical unrecognized states and dependencies

See also
 List of former sovereign states, which were independent and have been subsumed into transnational states like the United Kingdom
 Flags of active autonomist and secessionist movements, which are currently part of a transnational state but would like to secede from the state
 Gallery of sovereign state flags#Other states, which have declared independence, but whose independence has not been recognised by the majority of the international community